Pushkar Jog  (born 15 July 1985) is an Indian actor and dancer. Who primarily works in Marathi and Hindi films. In 2018, He participated in Bigg Boss Marathi 1 and become Runner-up.

Career 
Pushkar was born in Pune, Maharashtra. He did his acting debut at the age of 4. He gets a doctor degree in Dentistry. In 2007, He did his debut Marathi film Jabardast in lead role. He also appeared in Hindi films like Goodbuddy Gadbadi, Don't Worry Be Happy, Huff! It's Too Much, etc. Pushkar also works in Television shows like Nach Baliye Marathi,  Tu Tu Main Main, ABP Majha Around The World. etc. In 2018, He appeared in Bigg Boss Marathi 1 as a contestant.

Films

Hindi 

 Hum Dono
 Aise Bhi Kya Jaldi Hai
 Azmaish
 EMI
 Huff! It's Too Much
 Don't Worry Be Happy
 Goodbuddy Gadabadi

Marathi 

 Vajavu Ka
 Sun Ladki Sasarchi
 Sakharpuda
 Raosaheb
 Jabardast
 Satya
 Mission Possible
 Dhoom Two Dhamaal
 Tukya Tukvila Nagya Nachvila
 Raju
 Shikhar
 Sasu Cha Swayamvar
Ti And Ti
Well Done Baby!
Adrushya
Tamasha Live 
Victoria - Ek Rahasya

Television

Web series

References

External links
 Pushkar Jog on IMDb

Living people
Male actors from Mumbai
Indian male television actors
Participants in Indian reality television series
Male actors in Marathi cinema
Indian male soap opera actors
21st-century Indian male actors
Bigg Boss Marathi contestants
1985 births
Male actors in Marathi television